The Chauncey S. Taylor House, also known as the Richard Zeilinger House , is a historic house in David City, Nebraska. It was built in 1888 for Chauncey S. Taylor, a jeweler from Vermont. It was acquired by John Zeilinger in 1903. From 1921 to 1967, his son, Richard W. Zeilinger, lived in the house. The Zeilingers owned a hardware store in David City called Zeilinger Hardware. It was designed in the Second Empire and Queen Anne architectural styles. It has been listed on the National Register of Historic Places since June 25, 1982.

References

National Register of Historic Places in Butler County, Nebraska
Second Empire architecture in Nebraska
Queen Anne architecture in Nebraska
Houses completed in 1888